Arthur Lewis Brown (November 28, 1854 – June 10, 1928) was a United States district judge of the United States District Court for the District of Rhode Island.

Education and career

Born in Providence, Rhode Island, Brown received an Artium Baccalaureus degree from Brown University in 1876 and a Bachelor of Laws from Boston University School of Law in 1878. He was in private practice in Providence from 1878 to 1895.

Federal judicial service

Brown received a recess appointment from President Grover Cleveland on October 15, 1896, to a seat on the United States District Court for the District of Rhode Island vacated by Judge George Moulton Carpenter Jr. He was nominated to the same position by President Cleveland on December 8, 1896. He was confirmed by the United States Senate on December 15, 1896, and received his commission the same day. His service terminated on June 30, 1927, due to his retirement.

Death

Brown died on June 10, 1928, in Providence.

References

Sources
 

1854 births
1928 deaths
Judges of the United States District Court for the District of Rhode Island
United States federal judges appointed by Grover Cleveland
19th-century American judges
Arthur Lewis Brown